Julio Peralta and Horacio Zeballos were the defending champions and successfully defended their title, defeating Sergio Galdós and Fernando Romboli 7–6(7–5), 7–6(7–1) in the final.

Seeds

Draw

References
 Main Draw

Copa Fila - Doubles